William Henry Kelsey (October 2, 1812 – April 20, 1879) was a U.S. Representative from New York.

Born in Smyrna, New York, Kelsey attended the common schools. He studied law and was admitted to the bar in 1843 and commenced practice in Geneseo, New York. He was the Surrogate of Livingston County 1840–1844 and served as district attorney of Livingston County 1850–1853.

Kelsey was elected as an Opposition Party candidate to the Thirty-fourth Congress and reelected as a Republican to the Thirty-fifth Congress (March 4, 1855 – March 3, 1859). He served as chairman of the Committee on Engraving (Thirty-fourth Congress). He was not a candidate for renomination in 1858 to the Thirty-sixth Congress. He resumed the practice of his profession.

Kelsey was elected as a Republican to the Fortieth and Forty-first Congresses (March 4, 1867 – March 3, 1871). He voluntarily retired from political life and resumed the practice of law in Geneseo, New York, where he died on April 20, 1879. He was interred in Temple Hill Cemetery.

His brother was Edwin B. Kelsey, who was a lawyer, businessman, and Wisconsin state legislator. Another brother, Charles S. Kelsey, was also a Wisconsin legislator whose son, Otto Kelsey, was a New York legislator.

Notes

Sources

1812 births
1879 deaths
People from Chenango County, New York
Opposition Party members of the United States House of Representatives from New York (state)
Republican Party members of the United States House of Representatives from New York (state)
People from Geneseo, New York
New York (state) state court judges
New York (state) lawyers
19th-century American politicians
19th-century American judges
19th-century American lawyers